Takao Isokawa (born 10 June 1984 in Kumamoto) is a Japanese freestyle wrestler. He competed in the freestyle 96 kg event at the 2012 Summer Olympics; after defeating Nathaniel Tuamoheloa in the qualifications, he was eliminated by Magomed Musaev in the 1/8 finals.

References

External links
 

1984 births
Living people
Japanese male sport wrestlers
Olympic wrestlers of Japan
Wrestlers at the 2012 Summer Olympics
People from Kumamoto
Asian Games medalists in wrestling
Wrestlers at the 2010 Asian Games
Medalists at the 2010 Asian Games
Asian Games bronze medalists for Japan
20th-century Japanese people
21st-century Japanese people
Asian Wrestling Championships medalists